Chałupki  is a village in the administrative district of Gmina Sieradz, within Sieradz County, Łódź Voivodeship, in central Poland.

References

It also has a wide variety of alpacas and sheep neighboring nearby.

Villages in Sieradz County